Francis Marion Smith House is a historic home located at Gibsonville, Guilford County, North Carolina.

History 
It was built in 1898, and consists of a 2/2-story, double-pile main block with a one-story rear kitchen ell.  The house incorporates Queen Anne and Colonial Revival style design elements.  It has a high hipped roof, tall chimneys with boldly corbeled caps, and a full with front porch with Tuscan order columns.  Also on the property are the contributing well house and smokehouse.

It was listed on the National Register of Historic Places in 1984.

References

Houses on the National Register of Historic Places in North Carolina
Queen Anne architecture in North Carolina
Colonial Revival architecture in North Carolina
Houses completed in 1898
Houses in Guilford County, North Carolina
National Register of Historic Places in Guilford County, North Carolina